The 1926 Australian referendum was held on 4 September 1926. It contained two referendum questions.
__NoTOC__

Results in detail

Industry and Commerce
This section is an excerpt from 1926 Australian referendum (Industry and Commerce) § Results

Essential Services
This section is an excerpt from 1926 Australian referendum (Essential Services) § Results

See also
Referendums in Australia
Politics of Australia
History of Australia

References

Further reading
  
 .
 Australian Electoral Commission (2007) Referendum Dates and Results 1906 – Present AEC, Canberra.

1926 referendums
1926
Referendum
September 1926 events